Ago or AGO may refer to:

People
Ago Anderson (born 1972), Estonian actor
Ago-Endrik Kerge (1939–2021), Estonian ballet dancer, ballet master, director and actor
Ago of Friuli, 7th-century Duke of Friuli
Ago Markvardt (born 1969), Estonian skier
Ago Neo (1908–1982), Estonian wrestler
Agó Páez (born 1954), Uruguayan plastic artist
Ago Pajur (born 1962), Estonian historian
Ago Roo (born 1946), Estonian actor
Ago Ruus (born 1949). Estonian film cinematographer and director
Ago Silde (born 1963), Estonian politician
Agostino Carollo, Italian musician who released records as "Ago"
Erbi Ago (born 1990), Albanian model
Petrit Ago, Albanian civil servant
Roberto Ago (1907–1995), Italian jurist

Places
Ago Bay, a bay in Japan
Ago, Mie, a town in Japan
Ago-Oba, electoral district in Nigeria
Angola, ISO 3166-1 alpha-3 country code

Other uses
Ag-o (악어), a 1996 South Korean film
AGO Flugzeugwerke, a German aircraft manufacturer
AGO system, a manufacturing process for making stitchless shoes
Alpha Gamma Omega, a national, Christ-Centered fraternity
Adjutant General's Office or A.G.O.
American Guild of Organists
Argonaute proteins (AGO)
Art Gallery of Ontario
Attorney General's Office
 Attorney General of Ohio
 Attorney General of Oklahoma
 Attorney General of Ontario
 Attorney General of Oregon
Auditor General of Ontario
Australian Geospatial-Intelligence Organisation
Operation A-Go (あ号作戦), Japanese plans for the Battle of the Philippine Sea during World War Two
Silver(I,III) oxide (Ag4O4 or AgO)
Silver(I) oxide (Ag2O)
Tainae language

See also
Agos, Armenian newspaper from Turkey
Agos (TV series), Philippine TV series
AGOS (Auxiliary General Ocean Surveillance Ship) of the US Navy; see Ocean Surveillance Ship

Estonian masculine given names
Albanian-language surnames